The 1994 Australian Manufacturers' Championship was a CAMS sanctioned motor racing competition for 2.0 Litre Touring Cars complying with FIA Class II rules. The championship, which was promoted as the 1994 Valvoline Australian Manufacturers' Championship, began on 17 April 1994 at Eastern Creek Raceway and ended on 28 August at Oran Park Raceway after six rounds. The series determined both the winning automobile manufacturer in the 22nd Australian Manufacturers' Championship and the winning driver in the second annual Australian title for drivers of Class II Touring Cars. This title was awarded as the Australian 2.0 Litre Touring Car Championship in 1993 and as the Australian Super Touring Championship from 1995.

Teams and drivers

The following teams and drivers competed in the 1994 Australian Manufacturers' Championship.

Race calendar
The 1994 Australian Manufacturers Championship was contested over a six-round series in four states with two races per round.

Results

Manufacturers' Championship

Drivers Championship
Championship points were awarded on a 20-16-14-12-10-8-6-4-2-1 basis for the top ten positions in each race. Round positions were decided by the total points scored over the two races. In the event of two or more drivers having the same points for a round, they were ranked by finishing order in the second race.

See also
1994 Australian Touring Car season

References

External links
Image of Morris & Longhurst at the Winton round of the 1994 Australian Manufacturers’ Championship Retrieved from i180.photobucket.com on 24 February 2009

Australian Manufacturers' Championship
Australian Super Touring Championship
Manufacturers' Championship